Cross on Evidence is an authoritative textbook on the law of evidence in Australia.

History

The title refers to Sir Rupert Cross, who originally wrote the textbook in the United Kingdom in 1958. A number of editions were published including versions adapted to the law of Australia and New Zealand. The following editions are held in the National Library of Australia.

See also 
 Evidence (law)
 Criminal law of Australia
 English criminal law

References 

Law books
Law of Australia